Kimberly Guadalupe Loaiza Martinez (born 12 December 1997) is a Mexican singer and internet personality. In 2016, she began her YouTube career and she is currently the 7th most-followed user on TikTok.

Career 
Kimberly Loaiza's created her Twitter account when she was fourteen years old. Five years later, in 2016, she started vlogging on YouTube with her first video on November 15, 2016. Loaiza traveled to Colombia for rhinoplasty surgery. Loaiza initially made makeup videos, hair tutorials, and trivia for girls; however, over the years her content changed to make more vlogs, challenges and tags with her friends. In 2019, Loaiza began a career in music and released her first single, Enamorarme; later, other singles included "More, Tequila and shot, Turn off the light, Our Agreement, Don't be jealous", among others.

In 2020, Loaiza launched a clothing line, opened her own telephone company, broke the record of the most subscribers on YouTube for Spanish-speakers, and collaborated with other social media personalities such as James Charles. In 2021, Loaiza's partner, Juan de Dios Pantoja, appeared in a leaked video where he allegedly had sex with another woman. The scandal worsened when Lizbeth Rodríguez assured that she had the necessary evidence to expose Juan de Dios Pantoja's infidelity with Kevin Achutegui, a friend of Loaiza and is also known for being the personal photographer of both youtubers. After several videos defending himself,  de Dios Pantoja apologized to Loaiza, who forgave him and they continued their relationship.

In mid-2021, the "MTV MIAW 2021" awards were held. Loaiza was nominated for Icon MIAW, Creator of the Year, Couple on Fire (for her relationship with Juan de Dios Pantoja called "Jukilop") and Fandom of the Year.

Personal life 
Loaiza has been in a relationship with Juan de Dios Pantoja since 2012. After six years of dating, they announced the arrival of their first child. In 2020, Loaiza revealed that she had married Juan de Dios Pantoja, also mentioning that they were expecting their second child. Soon afterwards, their second child was born.

Discography

Singles
 Enamorarme - 2019
 Amandote (with Juan de Dios Pantoja)- 2019
 No Seas Celoso - 2019 
 Me Perdiste - 2020
 Bye Bye - 2020
 Do It (with Dimitri Vegas & Like Mike & Azteck) - 2020 
 Apaga La Luz - 2020
 Me Perdiste Remix (with Casper Magico & Lyanno) - 2021
 De Lao Remix (with Ely Blancarte, Elvis de Yongol & Franzata) - 2021
 Mejor Sola (with Zion & Lennox) - 2021
 Ya no somos - 2021
 Después de las 12 (with Ovi) - 2022
 Incondicional (with Juan de Dios Pantoja & Lyanno) - 2022

Filmography

TV

References

External links 
 
 

1997 births
Living people
People from Mexicali
YouTube channels launched in 2016
Spanish-language YouTubers
Mexican YouTubers
Mexican TikTokers
Singers from Baja California
Latin pop singers
Mexican women pop singers
21st-century Mexican singers
21st-century Mexican women singers

Video bloggers
YouTube vloggers
Mexican bloggers
Mexican women bloggers
Beauty and makeup YouTubers
Mexican make-up artists
Fashion influencers
Fashion YouTubers
Women in Latin music